Coll de Nargó is a municipality in the comarca of the Alt Urgell in Catalonia, a region of Spain. It is situated in the Segre valley by the Oliana reservoir. The municipality is served by the C-14 road between Ponts and La Seu d'Urgell, the L-511 road to Isona and the L-401 road to Sant Llorenç de Morunys. The Romanesque church of Sant Climent dates from the eleventh century, and has a rectangular pre-Romanesque bell-tower.

Demographics

Subdivisions 
The municipality of Coll de Nargó includes five outlying villages. Populations are given as of 2001, when the population of the village of Coll de Nargó was 463:
Gavarra (26), bordering the comarca of the Noguera
Les Masies de Nargó (30)
Montanissell (28), at the foot of the Sant Joan range
Sallent (38), on the south side of the Sant Joan range, linked with Montanissell by a forest track
Valldarques (15)

References

 Panareda Clopés, Josep Maria; Rios Calvet, Jaume; Rabella Vives, Josep Maria (1989). Guia de Catalunya, Barcelona: Caixa de Catalunya.  (Spanish).  (Catalan).

External links
 Government data pages 

Municipalities in Alt Urgell
Populated places in Alt Urgell